The Anvil is a concert hall and a performing arts centre in the town of Basingstoke in Hampshire, UK.

Built on a site originally set aside for the third phase of Basingstoke's shopping centre, The Anvil was built to tackle what was then seen as a 'cultural desert' in the Basingstoke area. The aim of the project was to raise the profile of the Borough and to establish it as a major regional centre with a range of first class facilities. Twenty years since its opening, it is still not exactly clear how effectively these aims have been fulfilled, but the Hall seems quite popular within the local area. The building's name reflects its unusual shape, particularly when seen from the western approach as it vaguely resembles the horn end of a traditional blacksmith's anvil. It has also been likened to the bow of a ship.

The hall plays host to a variety of touring productions, stand up comedians, live bands, opera, and most famously classical music. The hall is designed to be multi purpose, and has multiple stage formats that fit shows according to their needs, plus a removable proscenium to cater for more theatrical performances that require more than a standard 'black box' stage, notably opera and pantomime. The auditorium has adjustable seating and considered some of the finest acoustics of any concert hall in Europe. The acoustic design was by Richard Cowell of Arup Acoustics.

There is a small second auditorium, The Forge, which primarily plays host to acoustic and folk acts.

External links 
  Anvil Arts website for The Anvil and The Haymarket
 The Anvil - RHWL Architects page about the project
 Arup Acoustics

Theatres in Hampshire
Tourist attractions in Hampshire
Buildings and structures in Hampshire
Basingstoke
Event venues established in 1994
1994 establishments in the United Kingdom